ARA Gómez Roca (P-46) is the sixth and last ship of the MEKO 140A16  of six corvettes built in Germany for the Argentine Navy. The ship is the first ship to bear the name of Lieutenant Commander Sergio Gómez Roca, who commanded the Argentine patrol ship  during the Falklands War and died in action when the ship was attacked by Royal Navy helicopters. Originally the ship was to have been named Seaver after Captain Benjamin Seaver, a US-born naval hero of the Argentine War of Independence.

Origin 

Gómez Roca and her sister ships were part of the 1974 Naval Constructions National Plan, an initiative by the Argentine Navy to replace old World War II-vintage ships with more advanced warships. The original plan called for six MEKO 360H2 destroyers, four of them to be built in Argentina, but the plan was later modified to include four MEKO destroyers and six corvettes for anti-surface warfare and patrol operations.

Construction 

Gómez Roca was constructed at the Río Santiago Shipyards of the Astilleros y Fábricas Navales del Estado (State Shipyards and Naval Factories) state corporation. Her keel was laid down on 7 June 1983 and was launched on 14 November 1984. Fitting out of Gómez Roca and her sister ship  was suspended in 1992, briefly resumed in July 1994 and finally started again on 18 July 1997.  Following the resumption of construction, the ship was delivered to the Navy in 2004 and commissioned in 2005.

Both Robinson and Gómez Roca benefitted from their construction delay with better automation, communication and electronic systems than their four sister ships.

Service history 

Following her commissioning Gómez Roca participated in several naval exercises and conducted fishery patrol duties in the Argentine exclusive economic zone.

She is homeported at Puerto Belgrano Naval Base and is part of the Navy's 2nd Corvette Division with her five sister ships.

In March 2010, she operated with  during the Gringo-Gaucho / Southern Seas 2010 exercises as the aircraft carrier transited around South America to her new home base at San Diego.

As of 2021 Gómez Roca remained active and, in September, participated in a sea exercise also involving her sister ships Espora, Robinson and Spiro, along with the destroyer Sarandi.

References

Citations

Bibliography 
 Guia de los buques de la Armada Argentina 2005-2006. Ignacio Amendolara Bourdette, Editor n/a. (Spanish/English text)

Espora-class corvettes
Ships built in Argentina
1984 ships
Corvettes of Argentina